Mandy M. Roth is a New York Times and USA Today American novelist. Under her name, Mandy M. Roth, she writes paranormal romance and cozy paranormal mysteries, and as Reagan Hawk, she writes erotic romance.

Career
Roth has published with Harlequin Spice, Samhain Publishing, Ellora's Cave Publishing, Pocket Books, Running Press, Random House/Virgin/Black Lace, and The Raven Books.

She holds a Bachelor’s of Science in Business from the University of Findlay and a Vocational Commercial Art Degree from Sandusky High School.

Her writing career began in 2004 with the publication of Daughter of Darkness. "Loup Garou" was nominated for Romantic Times BookClub Magazine Review's Choice Nominee for Best Erotic Paranormal/Sci-Fi/Fantasy in 2006. Roth created and organized the Taming the Alpha anthology, which hit the New York Times and USA Today. Taming the Vampire, Taming the Monster, and Alphas for the Holidays were also listed on USA Today.

In 2013, Amazon launched a fan-fiction service called Kindle Worlds, which included properties from Warner Bros. Alloy Entertainment, such as "Gossip Girl," "Pretty Little Liars," and "The Vampire Diaries." Mandy wrote, "The Vampire Diaries: The Talisman Chronicles" for the now-defunct publishing platform.

Spellcasting with a Chance of Spirits was featured on USA Today in 2020. Roth was a long-term member of Romance Writer's of America and was honored for publishing over one hundred titles.

As Mandy M. Roth

Grimm Cove Series 

 Cloudy with a Chance of Witchcraft (2020) 
 Hexing with a Chance of Tornadoes (2020) 
 Spellcasting with a Chance of Spirits (2020) 
 Starry with a Chance of Nightshade
 Jack with a Chance of Frost

Daughter of Darkness Series 
 Daughter of Darkness. (April 2004)  
 The Enchantress (2004) 
 Bella Mia (2008)

Vampyre Production Series 
 The Valkyrie. Samhain Publishing. (2004) 
 Valhalla. Samhain Publishing. (2004)

PSI-Ops: Paranormal Security and Intelligence 
 Act of Mercy. The Raven Books. (2014) 
 Act of Surrender. The Raven Books. (2014) 
 Act of Submission. (2015) 
 Act of Command. Raven Happy Hour. (2016) 
 Act of Passion. Raven Happy Hour. (2018) 
 Act of Brotherhood. (2018) 
 Act of Surveillance
 Act of Freedom

Immortal Ops 

 Immortal Ops. Raven Happy Hour. (2004)  
 Critical Intelligence. New Concepts Publishing. (2006) 
 Radar Deception. New Concepts Publishing. (2007) 
 Strategic Vulnerability. Raven Happy Hour. (2011) 
 Tactical Magik. The Raven Books. (2014) 
 Administrative Control. The Raven Books. (2014) 
 Separation Zone. The Raven Books. (2015) 
 Area of Influence. Raven Happy Hour. (2017)

Immortal Outcasts 
 Broken Communication (2014) 
 Damage Report. Raven Happy Hour. (2015) 
 Isolated Maneuver. Raven Happy Hour. (2017) 
 Wrecked Intel. Raven Happy Hour. (2019)

Paranormal Security and Intelligence Ops: Shadow Agents 
 Wolf's Surrender. Raven Happy Hour. (2016) 
 The Dragon Shifter's Duty. Raven Happy Hour. (2016) 
 Healing the Wolf. Raven Happy Hour. (2018) 
Out of the Dark. Raven Happy Hour. (2020)

Paranormal Security and Intelligence Ops: Crimson Ops Series 
 Midnight Echoes. Raven Happy Hour. (2016) 
 Expecting Darkness. Raven Happy Hour. (2017) 
 Bound to Midnight. Raven Happy Hour. (2019) 
 Bat Out of Hell

Bewitchingly Ever After 

 Don't Stop Bewitching. (2018) 
 Everybody Wants to Rune the World. Raven Happy Hour. (2019) 
 Do You Really Want to Haunt Me. Raven Happy Hour. (2019)

Happily Everlasting Series 
 Once Hunted, Twice Shy. Raven Happy Hour. (2017) 
 Total Eclipse of the Hunt. Raven Happy Hour. (2017) 
 An Everlasting Christmas. Raven Happy Hour. (2018)

Tempting Fate Series 
 Loup Garou. The Raven Books. (2006) 
 Bad Moon Rising. The Raven Books. (2018)

The Guardians Series 
 The Guardians. The Raven Books. (2007) 
 Crossing Hudson. The Raven Books. (2016)  
 Ruling Jude

King of Prey Series 
 King of Prey. The Raven Books. (2006) 
 A View to a Kill. (2014) 
 Master of the Hunt. (2013) 
 Rise of the King. The Raven Books. (2014) 
 Prince of Pleasure. (2014) 
 Prince of Flight (2015) 
 Under His Wing. The Raven Books. (2018) 
 Flight Risk

Druid Series 
 Sacred Places. The Raven Books. (2014) 
Goddess of the Grove. (2018) 
 Winter Solstice. The Raven Books. (2013) 
 A Druid of Her Own. The Raven Books. (2015) 
 Seduced by the Highland Werewolf. Raven Happy Hour. (2019)

Prospect Springs Shifters Series 
 Blaze of Glory. (2011) 
 Parker's Honor. The Raven Books. (2013) 
 Gabe’s Fortune

Bureau of Paranormal Investigations Series 
 Hunted Holiday. (2014) 
 Heated Holiday

Zodiac Series Gatekeepers Series 
 Blaze of Glory. (2011) 
 Parker's Honor. The Raven Books. (2013) 
 Gabe’s Fortune

The League of the Unnatural Series 
 Pike’s Peak
 Adam’s Angel

Cyborg Desires Series (with Reagan Hawk) 
 Performance Criteria. Raven Happy Hour. (2006) 
 Magnetic Attraction. Raven Happy Hour. (2006)

Tipping the Scales Series 
 Tipping the Scales. Ellora's Cave. (2007) 
 Licking Fire

King’s Choice Series 
 The King’s Choice (2005)
 The Advisor’s Apprentice (2007)

Standalone Titles 
 Mating Behavior
 Warriors of the Darkness. New Concepts Publishing. (2006) 
 Trust in the Season
 Misfit in Middle America
 Gypsy Nights
 Executive Decision
 Ambient Light
 Sin's Pride. Harlequin Spice. (2010) 
 Dex's Claim. Harlequin Spice. (2011) 
 Eternal Seduction. Harlequin Spice. (2011) 
 Demonic Desires. The Raven Books. (2011) 
 Best Intentions. Samhain Publishing. (2011) 
 Dance of Souls
 Peace Offerings

Pleasure Cruise Series (with Michelle M. Pillow) 
 Pleasure Cruise. The Raven Books & Raven Happy Hour. (2005) with Michelle M. Pillow 
 Date with Destiny. The Raven Books & Raven Happy Hour. (2007) with Michelle M. Pillow 
 Pleasure Island. The Raven Books & Raven Happy Hour. (2016) with Michelle M. Pillow

Anthologies edited by Mandy M. Roth 
 Taming the Alpha (2014)
 Alphas for the Holidays (2016) 
 Taming the Monster (2015)

Other anthologies 
 Ghost Cats 2 (2006) with Michelle M. Pillow, Jaycee Clark, and Mandy M. Roth 
 Stop Dragon My Heart Around (2007) with Michelle M. Pillow and Mandy M. Roth 
 Ghost Cats. Samhain Publishing. (2011) with Jaycee Clark and Mandy M. Roth 
 Kiss of Christmas Magic (2014) 
 A Very Alpha Christmas (2015) 
Once Upon a Kiss: 17 Romantic Faerie Tales (2017)

As Reagan Hawk

Novels

Strength in Numbers Series 

 Strength in Numbers
 Space Pirates Bounty

The Beast Masters Series 

 Trading Teon. Raven Happy Hour. (2012) 
 Securing Sara. (2013)
 Rescuing Reya. The Raven Books. (2013)

Standalone Reagan Hawk 

 A King's Ransom. The Raven Books. (2013)

As Kennedy Kovit

Blazing Hearts Series 

 The Bet
 The Cowboy
 The Lover

Standalone Kennedy Kovit 

 Crazy for You

References

External links 
Mandy M. Roth Official Site
Mandy M. Roth at the Internet Speculative Fiction Database

21st-century American novelists
21st-century American women writers
American women novelists
Living people
American paranormal romance writers
Women romantic fiction writers
Women science fiction and fantasy writers
Year of birth missing (living people)